Jorge Manuel Brito Uceta (born June 22, 1966) is a former Major League Baseball catcher for the Colorado Rockies.

After being signed as an amateur free agent by the Oakland Athletics in 1986, Brito would make his Major League Baseball debut with the Colorado Rockies on April 30, 1995, and appear in his final game on April 21, 1996.

Brito spent both of his seasons at the Major League level serving as a backup catcher to former Rockies starters Joe Girardi and Jeff Reed.

External links

1966 births
Colorado Rockies players
Colorado Springs Sky Sox players
Dominican Republic expatriate baseball players in the United States
Huntsville Stars players
Living people
Louisville Redbirds players
Madison Muskies players
Major League Baseball catchers
Major League Baseball players from the Dominican Republic
Medford A's players
Modesto A's players
New Haven Ravens players
Syracuse SkyChiefs players
Tacoma Tigers players
Toros del Este players
White Dominicans